Reese Public Schools is a school district in Michigan. The district serves areas in Bay County, Saginaw County, and Tuscola County. The office of the superintendent is located in Reese High School in Reese.

In 2013, after the Buena Vista School District closed, three ex-Buena Vista students began attending Reese schools.

Schools
The schools within the district are Reese Elementary School, Reese Middle School, and Reese High School. Reese Middle School closed after the 2014–15 school year. Grades 6-8 were moved to the high school.

Athletics
Reese Public Schools is the home of the Rockets.

References

External links

 Reese Public Schools

School districts in Michigan
Education in Saginaw County, Michigan
Education in Bay County, Michigan
Education in Tuscola County, Michigan